Birendra Singh is an Indian politician, currently a member of Bharatiya Janata Party and a two time Member of Bihar Legislative Assembly from Wazirganj. He won this seat in 2010 Bihar Legislative Assembly election also.

In the 2020 Bihar Legislative Assembly election he and his family suffered from COVID-19, despite that he managed to secure his victory.

References 

Living people
1955 births
Bharatiya Janata Party politicians from Bihar
Bihar MLAs 2020–2025